Te Tai Hauāuru is a New Zealand parliamentary Māori electorate, returning one Member of Parliament to the New Zealand House of Representatives, that was first formed for the .

Population centres

Te Tai Hauāuru covers the western North Island, starting in the South Waikato before heading south through the King Country towns of Te Kūiti and Taumarunui to include all of the Taranaki region and all towns in the Manawatū-Whanganui region west of the Manawatū Gorge. Its southern terminus is in Wellington at Tawa. The main population centres are Tokoroa, New Plymouth, Whanganui, Palmerston North and Porirua. It is also home of the politically influential Rātana movement.

In the 2007 boundary redistribution, the area covered by the Ngāti Maniapoto tribe was transferred from the  electorate to Te Tai Hauāuru. The boundaries were not further altered in the 2013/14 redistribution.

History
The seat includes the Ngāti Tama, Ngāti Mutunga, Ngāti Maru (Taranaki), Te Āti Awa, Taranaki, Ngā Ruahine, Ngāti Ruanui, Ngā Rauru, Te Āti Haunui-a-Pāpārangi, Ngāti Apa, Ngāti Hauiti, Ngāti Raukawa ki te Tonga, Ngāti Kauwhata, Rangitāne, Muaūpoko, Ngāti Toa, Ngāti Maniapoto and Ngāti Huia tribal areas (rohe).

Te Tai Hauāuru was first used at the 1996 election and contained all area from South Auckland to just south of Te Kuiti. It was the growth of the Māori population leading to the creation first of Tāmaki Makaurau in 1999 and Tainui in 2002 that has pulled Ta Tai Hauāuru so far south that the only remaining part of the 1996 seat is its name.

Te Tai Hauāuru was won by New Zealand First candidate Tuku Morgan in its first contest, in what would be a clean sweep by New Zealand First of the five Māori seats that year. Discontent with New Zealand First's behaviour in government led to a reconciliation between Māori voters and the Labour Party, albeit briefly; the introduction of the Seabed and Foreshore bill to Parliament by the ruling Labour Party lead to a schism between the party and a significant section of its Māori voter base, including the MP for Te Tai Hauāuru, Tariana Turia. Turia resigned her seat to re-contest the seat in a 2004 by-election as the leader of the new Māori Party. She won 92.7 percent of the vote in a contest that Labour refused to participate in. In 2005, Turia was re-elected with nearly double the votes of her Labour rival, Errol Mason. In common with most of the Māori seats, Labour took a majority of the party vote. The results in 2008 were similar. She was succeeded by Adrian Rurawhe of the Labour Party, who defeated Chris McKenzie of the Māori Party.

The electorate became important for the Māori party again in 2020, as it was broadly considered the party's best chance at winning an electorate and returning to parliament. However, a poll released a few weeks before the election suggested that Labour's incumbent had a substantial lead over the Māori Party candidate, Debbie Ngarewa-Packer.

Members of Parliament
Key

List MPs
Members of Parliament elected from party lists in elections where that person also unsuccessfully contested the Te Tai Hauāuru electorate. Unless otherwise stated, all MPs terms began and ended at general elections.

Election results

2020 election

2017 election

2014 election

2011 election

Electorate (as at 26 November 2011): 32,617

2008 election

2005 election

2004 by-election

2002 election

1999 election

Notes

References

External links
Electorate profile Parliamentary Library

Māori electorates
1996 establishments in New Zealand